Blackburn Hundred (also known as Blackburnshire) is a historic sub-division of the county of Lancashire, in northern England. Its chief town was Blackburn, in the southwest of the hundred. It covered an area similar to modern East Lancashire, including the current districts of Ribble Valley (excluding the part north of the River Ribble and east of the Hodder, which was then in Yorkshire), Pendle (excluding West Craven, also in Yorkshire), Burnley, Rossendale, Hyndburn, Blackburn with Darwen, and South Ribble (east from Walton-le-dale and Lostock Hall).

Much of the area is hilly, bordering on the Pennines, with Pendle Hill in the midst of it, and was historically sparsely populated. It included several important royal forests. In the 18th century several towns in the area became industrialized and densely populated, including Blackburn itself, and Burnley.

Early history
The shire probably originated as a county of the Kingdom of Northumbria, but was much fought over. In the Domesday Book it was among the hundreds between the Ribble and Mersey rivers ("Inter Ripam et Mersam" in the Domesday Book) that were included with the information about Cheshire, though they are now in Lancashire and cannot be said clearly to have then been part of Cheshire. The area may have been annexed to the embryonic Kingdom of England following the Battle of Brunanburh in 937.

The Domesday Book entry shows that before the Norman conquest, the hundred had been held directly by King Edward. It mentions royal holdings in Blackburn, Huncoat, Walton-le-Dale and Pendleton, and those of a church at Blackburn and St Mary's in Whalley. Also it talks of 28 freemen holding land as manors, but gives no further details about them. After the conquest Blackburnshire was part of a large area given to Roger de Poitou and he had demised it to Roger de Busli and Albert de Gresle.

Domesday also mentions a sizable area of woodland.

Later the much the east of the hundred was established as royal hunting grounds, Known as the forest of Blackburnshire it was divided into the four forests of Accrington, Pendle, Trawden and Rossendale.

Feudal period
At the start of the 12th century Roger de Poitou joined the failed rebellion against King Henry I in favor of his brother Robert Curthose, as a result losing his English holdings. In 1102 King Henry granted the whole of Blackburnshire and part of Amounderness to Robert de Lacy, the Lord of Pontefract, while confirming his possession of Bowland. These lands formed the basis of the Honour of Clitheroe.
Subsequently most of the ancient parish of Ribchester, except the township of Alston-with-Hothersall, and in the ancient parish of Chipping, the vills of Aighton and Dutton and part of the forest of Bowland belonging ecclesiastically to the ancient parish of Great Mitton were annexed to Blackburnshire.

The separateness of the district was reinforced when it became a royal bailiwick in 1122. In 1182, it became part of the newly created County Palatine of Lancaster.

By 1243 it is believed that there were 57 manors in the hundred.

Those held in demesne were Colne, Great and Little Marsden, Briercliffe, Burnley, Ightenhill, Habergham, Padiham, Huncoat, Hapton, Accrington, Haslingden, Downham, Worston, Chatburn and Little Pendleton.

Those held by thegnage were: Twiston, Chipping, Thornley, Wheatley, Ribchester, Dutton, Dinckley, Henthorn, Wilpshire, Clayton-le-Dale, Salesbury, Osbaldeston, Samlesbury, Read, Simonstone, Oswaldtwistle, Livesey, Birtwistle, Church, Cliviger and Worsthorne.

Those held by knight's service were: Little Mitton, Wiswell, Hapton, Towneley, Coldcoats, Snodworth, Twiston, Extwistle, Aighton, Great Mearley, Livesey, Downham, Foulridge, Little Mearley, Rishton, Billington, Altham, Great Harwood, Clayton le Moors, and Walton in le Dale.

Post medieval

The hundred of Blackburnshire continued to have administrative relevance until the abandonment of the system of hundreds in the early 19th century, long after feudalism ceased in England. As in other parts of England, the hundred was divided into parishes which were ecclesiastical parishes as well as being used for administrative purposes, like modern English civil parishes.

Early Blackburnshire had only two parishes, each covering a considerable but sparsely populated area. Whalley (now a much smaller parish) was the larger of the two, and covered the east of the hundred, while Blackburn parish covered the west. As mentioned above, the hundred was expanded to cover parts of the parishes of Chipping, Ribchester and Mitton. As Blackburnshire became more heavily populated and economically developed, the parishes of Whalley and Blackburn were split into many smaller parts over the centuries.

The ancient parish of Blackburn contained Blackburn, Little Harwood, Ramsgreave, Salesbury, Clayton-le-Dale, Mellor, Witton, Pleasington, Over Darwen, Lower Darwen, Eccleshill, Tockholes, Livesey, Walton-Le-Dale, Cuerdale, Samlesbury, Balderston, Osbaldeston, Billington, Wilpshire, Dinckley, Great Harwood, Rishton. It also included Yate and Pickup Bank with extra-parochial status.
The ancient parish of Whalley contained Whalley, Clitheroe, Chatburn, Worston, Mearley, Bowland-with-Leagram, Mitton, Henthorn and Coldcoats, Pendleton with Pendleton Hall, Standen And Standen Hey (Standen was extra-parochial), Wiswell, Church, Oswaldtwistle, Huncoat, Altham, Clayton-Le-Moors, Old Accrington, New Accrington, Haslingden, Higher Booths, Lower Booths, Henheads, Newchurch in Pendle, Burnley, Habergham Eaves, Briercliffe with Extwistle, Worsthorne with Hurstwood, Cliviger, Ightenhill Park (extra-parochial), Reedley Hallows, Filly Close and New Laund Booth (extra-parochial), Padiham, Simonstone, Read, Hapton, Higham with West Close Booth, Heyhouses (extra-parochial), Dunnockshaw (extra-parochial), Goldshaw Booth, Barley-with-Wheatley Booth, Roughlee Booth, Wheatley Carr Booth (extra-parochial), Old Laund Booth, Colne, Marsden, Barrowford Booth, Foulridge, Trawden, Downham, and Twiston.

Blackburn became a separate archdeaconry, splitting off from the archdeaconry of Manchester, in 1877, and becoming the Diocese of Blackburn in 1926.

References
Notes

Citations

Bibliography

Morgan, P. (1978). Domesday Book Cheshire: Including Lancashire, Cumbria, and North Wales. Chichester, Sussex: Phillimore & Co. Ltd. .
Phillips A. D. M., and Phillips, C. B. (2002),  A New Historical Atlas of Cheshire. Chester, UK: Cheshire County Council and Cheshire Community Council Publications Trust. .

External links
Entry for Blackburn at domesdaybook.co.uk
HUNDRED OF BLACKBURN - British History Online
Parish of Whalley - British History Online

Hundreds of Lancashire
History of Blackburn with Darwen